In probability theory, the law (or formula) of total probability is a fundamental rule relating marginal probabilities to conditional probabilities. It expresses the total probability of an outcome which can be realized via several distinct events, hence the name.

Statement
The law of total probability is a theorem that states, in its discrete case, if  is a finite or countably infinite partition of a sample space (in other words, a set of pairwise disjoint events whose union is the entire sample space) and each event  is measurable, then for any event  of the same sample space:

or, alternatively,

where, for any  for which  these terms are simply omitted from the summation, because   is finite.

The summation can be interpreted as a weighted average, and consequently the marginal probability, is sometimes called "average probability"; "overall probability" is sometimes used in less formal writings.

The law of total probability can also be stated for conditional probabilities: 

Continuous case
The law of total probability extends to the case of conditioning on events generated by continuous random variables. Let  be a probability space. Then the law of total probability states 

If  admits a density function , then the result is 

Moreover, for the specific case where , where  is a Borel set, then this yields

Example
Suppose that two factories supply light bulbs to the market. Factory X's bulbs work for over 5000 hours in 99% of cases, whereas factory Y's bulbs work for over 5000 hours in 95% of cases. It is known that factory X supplies 60% of the total bulbs available and Y supplies 40% of the total bulbs available. What is the chance that a purchased bulb will work for longer than 5000 hours?

Applying the law of total probability, we have:

 

where
  is the probability that the purchased bulb was manufactured by factory X;
  is the probability that the purchased bulb was manufactured by factory Y;
  is the probability that a bulb manufactured by X will work for over 5000 hours;
  is the probability that a bulb manufactured by Y will work for over 5000 hours.

Thus each purchased light bulb has a 97.4% chance to work for more than 5000 hours.

Other names
The term law of total probability is sometimes taken to mean the law of alternatives, which is a special case of the law of total probability applying to discrete random variables. One author uses the terminology of the "Rule of Average Conditional Probabilities", while another refers to it as the "continuous law of alternatives" in the continuous case. This result is given by Grimmett and Welsh  as the partition theorem, a name that they also give to the related law of total expectation.

See also
 Law of total expectation
 Law of total variance
 Law of total covariance
 Law of total cumulance
 Marginal distribution

Notes

References 
 Introduction to Probability and Statistics by Robert J. Beaver, Barbara M. Beaver, Thomson Brooks/Cole, 2005, page 159.
 Theory of Statistics, by Mark J. Schervish, Springer, 1995.
 Schaum's Outline of Probability, Second Edition, by John J. Schiller, Seymour Lipschutz, McGraw–Hill Professional, 2010, page 89.
 A First Course in Stochastic Models, by H. C. Tijms, John Wiley and Sons, 2003, pages 431–432.
 An Intermediate Course in Probability, by Alan Gut, Springer, 1995, pages 5–6.

Probability theorems
Statistical laws